Phong Phú Hà Nam Women's Football Club is a Vietnam women's football club, based in Hà Nam, Vietnam. The team will play in the Vietnam women's football championship.

The team is currently playing at Hà Nam Stadium.

History 
The club was founded in 2001 as Hà Nam W.F.C in Hà Nam, Vietnam.

Honours

Domestic competitions

League
 Vietnam women's football championship
  Winners (1): 2018

Current squad
As of May 2017

References
 

Women's football in Vietnam